Hrnčiarovce nad Parnou is a village and municipality of the Trnava District in the Trnava region of Slovakia. The village is 5 km southwest from the centre of the town of Trnava. Weather in Hrnčiarovce nad Parnou: www.meteohnp.wz.sk

Significant people
 Ján Hlubík (*1896 – † 1965), SDB,  Roman Catholic priest end religious prisoner (sentenced to 2 years in prison).
Jozef Forner (*1905 – † 1983), SDB,  Roman Catholic priest end Missionary (Japan).
Ľudovít Koiš (*1935 – † 2012), football player
Eva Biháryová (*1949 – † 2020), singer and musician

See also
 List of municipalities and towns in Slovakia

References

Genealogical resources

The records for genealogical research are available at the state archive "Statny Archiv in Bratislava, Slovakia"

 Roman Catholic church records (births/marriages/deaths): 1692-1896 (parish A)
 Lutheran church records (births/marriages/deaths): 1666-1895 (parish B)

External links
https://web.archive.org/web/20070513023228/http://www.statistics.sk/mosmis/eng/run.html
Surnames of living people in Hrnciarovce nad Parnou

Villages and municipalities in Trnava District